Alessandro Scarano (born 3 September 1983) is a Sammarinese politician who is one of two Captains Regent-elects (heads of government for San Marino), that is expecting to assume office on 1 April 2023. He will serve alongside Adele Tonnini.

Biography 
Scarano was born in Borgo Maggiore and has a degree in law from the University of Bologna.

He is a member of the Sammarinese Christian Democratic Party since 2002. He served in the XXVII legislature of the Grand and General Council from 2008 to 2012 and again in the XXX legislature since 2019. He is he is a member of the Foreign and Internal Affairs Commissions and is passionate about travel, art and archaeology. He practiced horse riding at a competitive level, winning the San Marino championship.

On 17 March 2023 the Grand and General Council elected him and Adele Tonnini as Captains Regent of San Marino to serve from 1 April 2023 to 1 October 2023.

References 

1983 births
Living people
People from Borgo Maggiore
Captains Regent of San Marino
Members of the Grand and General Council
Sammarinese Christian Democratic Party politicians
Sammarinese lawyers
University of Bologna alumni